Blaydon Bridge is one of the main bridges crossing the River Tyne in North East England linking Scotswood in Newcastle upon Tyne and Blaydon in Gateshead.

The bridge was designed by Bullen and Partners and built by Edmund Nuttall Ltd between 1987 and 1990.  It is a concrete bridge with two concrete piers in the river. When completed, it formed the link between the existing Gateshead Western By-pass and the newly constructed Newcastle-upon-Tyne Western By-pass. From the opening, it was designated as the A1 road: before the Blaydon Bridge was built the A1 crossed the Tyne to the east of Newcastle and Gateshead via the Tyne Tunnel. It was officially opened by the Queen on 1 December 1990.

References

 
 Bridges om the Tyne: Blaydon Bridge

Bridges in Tyne and Wear
Bridges completed in 1990
Buildings and structures in Newcastle upon Tyne
Crossings of the River Tyne
Transport in Newcastle upon Tyne
A1 road (Great Britain)